Lieutenant Colonel Andrew Beauchamp St John, 21st Baron St John of Bletso TD (23 August 1918 – 11 February 1978) was an English peer.

He was the third son of Rowland Tudor St John (third son of Beauchamp St John, 17th Baron St John of Bletso) and Katherine Madge Lockwood (second daughter of Sir Frank Lockwood). He was educated at Wellington College from 1932 to 1935 and joined the Bank of England in 1937. He served in the British Army in World War II, and was later was a Lt-Colonel in the Royal Artillery (TA), commanding the Tower Hamlets Regiment (TA) from 1951 to 1954. He was awarded the Territorial Decoration.
 
After the war he was living at Old Deer Park Gardens Richmond with his parents, and in 1955 married Katherine Berg, daughter of Alfred Berg. He emigrated to South Africa in 1957 where he joined Syfret's Trust Company in Cape Town. He became the 21st Baron St John on the death of his cousin in 1976 but only lived to enjoy it for one year.

References
 Burke's Baronetage & Peerage

1918 births
1978 deaths
British expatriates in South Africa
People from Cape Town
Andrew
Barons St John of Bletso
20th-century British Army personnel
Royal Artillery officers
20th-century English nobility